Daniel Edwin Henshall (born 9 August 1982) is an Australian film, television and theatre actor, known for his work in Snowtown, The Babadook and Turn: Washington's Spies.

Early life and education

Born and raised in Sydney, Australia, he is the youngest of three children.

Career
Henshall is best known for his portrayal as serial killer John Bunting in Justin Kurzel's Snowtown (2011), based on the Snowtown murders in South Australia. Film critic Roger Ebert called his performance "astonishingly good", Megan Lehmann of The Hollywood Reporter said it was "disturbingly excellent", and IndieWire named it one of the best of performances of the year. Henshall was awarded, among others, the AACTA Award for Best Actor in a Leading Role.

For four seasons, Henshall played whaler spy Caleb Brewster in the AMC TV series Turn: Washington's Spies (2014–2017). Writer/director Jennifer Kent cast him as Robbie in her debut feature film, the psychological horror The Babadook (2014). In the live action version of Ghost in the Shell (2017) he played Skinny Man, re-enacting the iconic water fight from the original 1995 anime.

Acclaimed South Korean director Bong Joon-ho cast him as Blonde, animal rights-activist and boyfriend of Silver, in the action-adventure feature film Okja (2017). He plays Slayer, skinhead and Bryons chief rival in Skin (2018), based on the life of Bryon Widner and work of Daryle Lamont Jenkins.

He won praise from reviewers for his portrayal as the Archibald Prize-winning artist Adam Cullen in  Acute Misfortune (2019), including in The Guardian, Filmink, Variety, and The Hollywood Reporter. He was nominated for the 2019 Film Critics Circle of Australia, and 2020 Australian Film Critics Association Awards for Best Actor.

Henshall played murder suspect and sex offender, Leonard Patz, in the Apple TV+ limited series Defending Jacob (2020). His portrayal of criminal on the run Daryl Dun, aka Santa, in the family Christmas comedy A Sunburnt Christmas (2020), was well received by the Sydney Morning Herald, and The Guardian.

Next he will be seen in the thriller To Catch a Fair One (2021), due to premiere in competition at the 2021 TriBeCa Film Festival, and later in the year  in Clickbait (2021) for Netflix.

Credits

Film

Television

Theatre

References

External links

21st-century Australian male actors
Australian male film actors
Australian male television actors
Living people
Best Actor AACTA Award winners
1982 births